Pelasgus stymphalicus, also known as the dáska or stymphalia minnow, is a threatened species of small freshwater fish. It is a short-lived species, and reaches a maximum length of 12 cm.

P. stymphalicus is endemic to slow-flowing rivers and wetlands in the Peloponnese and disjunctly in Lake Stymphalia, a natural eutrophic lake without surface drainage. The main threats to P. stymphalicus are habitat destruction, water extraction and pollution, although the species is resilient and well-adapted to unstable conditions. It is protected under Appendix II of the EU's Habitats Directive (1992) and under Appendix III of the Bern Convention, (1982).

References

Economidis, P.S., 1995, Endangered freshwater fishes of Greece., Biological Conservation,  72, 201-211
Crivelli, A.J., 1996. The freshwater fish endemic to the Mediterranean region. An action plan for their conservation.. Tour du Valat Publication, 171 p.
Early development of Pseudophoxinus stymphalicus (Cyprinidae) from lake Trichonis, Greece Daoulas C. ; Psarras T. ; Barbieri T - Seliki R. ; Economou A. N. ; Cybium  (Cybium)  ISSN 0399-0974, 1995

External links
 Eschmeyer database Pseudophoxinus stymphalicus
 Hellenic Ministry for Environment: Limni Stymfalia
 differing findings (South-Peloponnese, Evrotas), Pseudophoxinus stymphalicus

Taxa named by Achille Valenciennes
Pelasgus (fish)
Fish described in 1844